The 7th Pearl International Film Festival took place in Kampala, Uganda from 6th to 10 November 2017. Rain won Best Picture. First time director Daniel Mugerwa won the best director prize. Filmmaker Rhonnie Nkalubo Abraham was named the Festival Director.

Jury
Polly Kamukama
Andrew Kaggwa
Maurine Kintu

Awards
The following awards were presented at the 7th edition.

BEST FEATURE FILM 
 Rain

BEST DIRECTOR 
Daniel Mugerwa (Rain)

BEST MALE ACTOR 
Bwanika felix (Faithful)
 
BEST FEMALE ACTOR 
Aganza Kisaka (Faithful)
 
BEST YOUNG ACTOR 
Toni Rucci (The Last Breath)

BEST SHORT FILM 
The Last Breath

BEST DOCUMENTARY 
Omweso

BEST SCREENPLAY 
Rain

BEST TELEVISION DRAMA 
Ba Aunt

BEST CINEMATOGRAPHY 
Alex Ireeta  (Love Faces)

BEST SOUND 
Breaking with Customes

BEST PRODUCTION DESIGN
Rain

BEST COSTUME 
Vvolongoto Mu Mukwano

BEST SPECIAL EFFECTS AND MAKEUP 
Faithful

ACHIEVEMENT IN EDITING 
My Ex-girlfriend

BEST SUPPORTING ACTOR 
Faisal Katumba (SenteMuki)

BEST SUPPORTING ACTRESS 
Joanita Bewulira (Rain)

BEST INDIGENOUS LANGUAGE FILM 
Vvolongoto Mu Mukwano

Life Achievement Award 
Joanita Bewulira

Jury Award 
Pearl Wonders

Piff Directors Award (Trail Blazer) 
Mariam Ndagire

References

2017 film festivals